"Over My Shoulder" is a pop rock song by British rock supergroup Mike + The Mechanics. It was released on 13 February 1995 as the first single from their fourth album, Beggar on a Beach of Gold (1995). Written by Paul Carrack and Mike Rutherford and sung by Carrack, it was the most successful single from that album, peaking at number 12 on UK Singles Chart. It became the band's only hit in certain European countries, including Switzerland and France; in the latter country, it reached number nine and spent 20 weeks in the top 50.

Critical reception
Steve Baltin from Cash Box noted that the song "has received many generous reviews." But he felt that "there's little imagination to this song, and the programmed rhythm has even managed to take the soul out of Paul Carracks blue-eyed vocals. Lastly, any song that includes whistling, other than Otis Redding's 'Dock Of The Bay', is asking for trouble. However, it’ll still receive fair amounts of airplay, especially on Adult/Contemporary."

Music video
The accompanying music video for "Over My Shoulder" was shot primarily on the village green in Chiddingfold on the Weald in Waverley, Surrey, England. The parish church of St Mary's, with its distinctive tower, as well as the village pub The Crown, also appear. It features Nick Pickard (Tony Hutchinson from the Channel 4 soap opera Hollyoaks) as a love-struck teenaged boarding school pupil and Tom Fletcher (later in the pop-rock band McFly) as a little boy in a junior school classroom.

Track listings
 UK CD1
 "Over My Shoulder" – 3:34
 "Something to Believe In" – 4:19
 "Always the Last to Know" – 4:10

 UK CD2
 "Over My Shoulder" – 3:34
 "Something to Believe In" – 4:19
 "Word of Mouth" – 3:55
 "Over My Shoulder" (live) – 5:25

 UK cassette and limited-edition 7-inch single
 "Over My Shoulder" – 3:34
 "Something to Believe In" – 4:18

Charts

Weekly charts

Year-end charts

Certifications

Release history

References

1994 songs
1995 singles
Atlantic Records singles
Mike + The Mechanics songs
Song recordings produced by Christopher Neil
Songs written by Mike Rutherford
Songs written by Paul Carrack
Virgin Records singles